Wai Ren or Bu Ren, personal name Zi Fa, was a Shang dynasty King of China.

In the Records of the Grand Historian he was listed by Sima Qian as the eleventh Shang king, succeeding his brother Zhong Ding. He was enthroned in the year of Gengxu with Ao as his capital. During his reign there was a rebellion from Shang's vassals of Pei and Xian peoples. He ruled for 15 years (although the Bamboo Annals claim  10 years) before his death. He was given the posthumous name Wai Ren and was succeeded by his son He Dan Jia.

Oracle bone script inscriptions on bones unearthed at Yinxu alternatively record that he was the tenth Shang king, given the posthumous name Bu Ren and succeeded by his son Jian Jia.

References

Shang dynasty kings